The Concert is a lost 1921 silent comedy film directed by Victor Schertzinger and starring Lewis Stone, Myrtle Stedman, Raymond Hatton and Mabel Julienne Scott. It was produced and distributed by Goldwyn Pictures. It was based upon the 1909 play of the same title by Hermann Bahr.

Plot
A concert pianist, the romantic idol of many women, is seduced away from his wife. The seductress's husband takes in the pianist's wife, and all four pretend to be happy with the new arrangement.

Cast
 Lewis Stone
 Myrtle Stedman	
 Raymond Hatton
 Gertrude Astor
 Mabel Julienne Scott
 Russ Powell
 Lydia Yeamans Titus

References

External links

The Concert (SilentHollywood)

1921 films
Films directed by Victor Schertzinger
1921 comedy films
Goldwyn Pictures films
Lost American films
American silent feature films
American black-and-white films
Silent American comedy films
1921 lost films
Lost comedy films
American films based on plays
1920s American films
1920s English-language films